The Climate Change Commission (He Pou a Rangi) is an independent Crown entity that advises the New Zealand Government on climate change policy within the framework of the Climate Change Response (Zero Carbon) Amendment Act. The Commission was established as the successor to the Interim Climate Change Committee following the passage of the Zero Carbon Act in November 2019.

Mandates and functions
The Climate Change Commission advises the New Zealand Government on policy that will reduce carbon emissions and meet New Zealand's 2050 emission reduction and adaption goals. The Commission also seeks to partner with Māori with developing advice and targets. Other responsibilities including monitoring and reporting on government progress on climate change and developing advice on reducing emissions and meeting the Government's target of a "net-zero, low emissions" New Zealand/Aotearoa.

Besides monitoring the Government's progress against the 2050 target, the first emissions budget and the emissions reduction plan, other functions including monitoring the adaptation plan and reporting on progress on primary sector climate change commitments.

Jo Hendy is the Climate Change Commission's chief executive. She was previously with the secretariat of the Interim Climate Change Committee (ICCC) and is a former director of research and analysis for the Parliamentary Commissioner for the Environment.

Board membership
Since its inception, the Climate Change Commission has been chaired by Rod Carr, a former chair and non-executive director of the Reserve Bank of New Zealand and a former vice-chancellor of the University of Canterbury. Other members include:
Lisa Tumahai, deputy chairperson of the Commission, former deputy chairperson of the ICCC, and Ngāi Tahu leader
Dr Harry Clark, an agricultural greenhouse gas expert and former member of the ICCC
Dr Judy Lawrence, former coordinating lead author with the Intergovernmental Panel on Climate Change (IPCC)
Catherine Leining, climate change mitigation policy adviser and former civil servant
Dr James Renwick, climate change scientist and lead author on three IPCC assessment reports 
Dr Nicola Shadbolt, chairperson of Plant & Food Research and former director of Fonterra and Transit New Zealand.

History

Formation
The Climate Change Commission was established as the successor to the Interim Climate Change Committee (ICCC) in November 2019 following the passage of the Climate Change Response (Zero Carbon) Amendment Act. The organisation was tasked with developing an evidence-based plan for New Zealand to fulfill its climate change goals within the framework of the Zero Carbon Act. 

On 24 April 2020, Climate Change Minister James Shaw asked the Climate Commission Change Commission to review New Zealand's emission reduction target under the Paris Agreement, focusing on New Zealand's methane and carbon commitments.

In mid-May 2020, Climate Change Commission Chair Rod Carr criticised the 2020 New Zealand budget as insufficient for fulfilling New Zealand's carbon neutral goals. However, Carr welcomed the budget's commitments towards research, forestry, improving bush and wetlands, tightening the New Zealand Emissions Trading Scheme, rail and home insulation.

First report
On 31 January 2021, the Climate Change Commission released its first report, which proposed  phasing out petrol-powered cars, accelerated renewable energy generation, reducing the number of cows, and growing more native forests to meet New Zealand's carbon neutral goals by 2050. Chairman Carr defended the advice as ambitious but claimed it was realistic and advocated "immediate and decisive" action. Prime Minister Jacinda Ardern claimed that the impact of the proposed reforms would not be an economic burden. 

In response, the Automobile Association's spokesperson Simon Douglas and Z Energy chief executive Mike Bennetts said that more investment was needed to encourage people to use electric vehicles including charging stations and cheaper prices. Gasfitters and plumbers also expressed concern that a proposed ban on new gas installations from 2025 would hurt their economic livelihood and careers. The coal industry also expressed concerns about the Commission's plan to phase out fossil fuels by 2050.

June 2021 report
On 9 June 2021, the Climate Commission issued a report recommending the reduction of animal numbers at farms, no new household gas connections by 2025, and shifting to electric vehicles within the next decade in order to reduce greenhouse emissions. Prime Minister Ardern and Climate Change Minister James Shaw endorsed the Climate Commission's report. On 14 June, the Government announced that it would introduce subsidies to make electric cars cheaper while raising the price of new petrol and new diesel vehicles. Beginning in July 2021, subsidies for new electric and hybrid vehicles will be up to NZ$8,625 (£4,360) and NZ$3,450 (£1,744) for used cars. 

In response to the policy announcement, EV City owner David Boot said that it would boost demand for electric cars while expressing concern about the need for educating electric car users. Motor Trade Association chief executive Craig Pomare claimed that the rebate would not be enough to encourage motor users to make the switch to electric cars, while Federated Farmers national president Andrew Hoggard expressed concerns about the lack of electric vehicle alternatives for farmers and tradespersons, advocating a waiver for farmers. On 16 July 2021, the farmers advocacy group Groundswell NZ organised a nationwide Howl of a Protest campaign across 57 towns and cities to protest the government's new regulations.

See also
 Climate Change Committee – the UK entity on which the Climate Change Commission was based

Notes and references

External links
Official website

2019 establishments in New Zealand
Agriculture in New Zealand
Climate change policy
Climate change in New Zealand
Environmental policy in New Zealand
Government of New Zealand